Series Tenuifoliae is a series within the genus Crataegus that contains at least seven species of hawthorn trees and shrubs, native to Eastern North America, with one disjunct species (C. wootoniana) in the mountains of New Mexico.

Species
The principal species in the series are:
 Crataegus flabellata
 Crataegus schuettei
 Crataegus roribacca
 Crataegus fluviatilis
 Crataegus iracunda
 Crataegus macrosperma
 Crataegus wootoniana
The following rare local species appear to be hybrid derivatives of series Tenuifoliae:
 Crataegus × fretalis
 Crataegus × lucorum

References

Tenuifoliae
Flora of North America
Plant series